is a Japanese professional footballer who plays as a midfielder for  club Albirex Niigata.

Club statistics
.

Honours

Club
 Urawa Red Diamonds
J.League Cup: 2016
J1 League: 2016 Runner-up
AFC Champions League: 2017

 Albirex Niigata
J2 League: 2022

Individual
J2 League Best XI: 2022

References

External links
Profile at Albirex Niigata

1998 births
Living people
Association football people from Osaka Prefecture
Sportspeople from Osaka
Japanese footballers
J1 League players
J2 League players
Urawa Red Diamonds players
Mito HollyHock players
Oita Trinita players
Albirex Niigata players
Association football midfielders